Muhammad Nor Azam bin Abdul Azih (born 3 January 1995) is a Malaysian professional footballer who plays as a central midfielder for Malaysia Super League club Sri Pahang and the Malaysia national team. He can operate as a box-to-box midfielder and is known for his creativity, accurate passes, ball control and technique. He is also known as a long range shoot specialist.

Career

Club
Nor Azam was born in Jengka 21, Maran, Pahang and is the fifth of six siblings. He was member of Harimau Muda B that competed in 2014 S.League.

Nor Azam was signed from Harimau Muda B at the start of 2015 season. His first appearances for Pahang was against Johor Darul Ta'zim on 31 January 2015 coming on from a bench in the 85th minute.

He received his breakthrough with Pahang when Azidan Sarudin picked up an injury early in the 2015 season. He took full advantage of it and the more experienced Azidan found himself on the bench once he recovered. Overall he made 24 appearances in all competition for Pahang during his season debut but an anterior cruciate ligament injury in July 2015 ruled him out for the rest of the season.

On 16 March 2023, he made his 200 appearances in all competitions for Pahang in a 3-0 away win against Perak.

International career
On 27 May 2017, Nelo Vingada called up Nor Azam for the senior team to play in 2019 AFC Asian Cup qualification. During 2017 Southeast Asian Games in Kuala Lumpur, Nor Azam made 5 appearances and scored 1 goal.

Career statistics

Club

International

International goals
Malaysia U-23

Honours
Sri Pahang
 Malaysia FA Cup: 2018

International
Malaysia U-23
 Southeast Asian Games
 Silver Medal: 2017

References

External links
 

1995 births
Living people
Sri Pahang FC players
Malaysian footballers
Malaysian people of Malay descent
People from Pahang
Malaysia Super League players
Association football midfielders
Southeast Asian Games silver medalists for Malaysia
Southeast Asian Games medalists in football
Competitors at the 2017 Southeast Asian Games
Malaysia international footballers